Drepanacra is a genus of lacewings belonging to the family Hemerobiidae.

The species of this genus are found in Australia and New Zealand.

Species:

Drepanacra binocula 
Drepanacra khasiana 
Drepanacra plaga

References

Hemerobiiformia
Neuroptera genera